A telescope is an instrument designed for the observation of remote objects.

Telescope(s) also may refer to:

Music
 The Telescopes, a British psychedelic band
 Telescope (album), by Circle, 2007
 The Telescope (album), by Her Space Holiday, 2006
 Telescopes (EP), by Waking Ashland, 2006
 "Telescope" (song), by Hayden Panettiere, 2012
 "Telescope", a song by Cheryl Cole from A Million Lights, 2012
 "Telescopes", a song by Reks from Grey Hairs, 2008

Other media
 Telescope (TV series), a 1963–1973 Canadian documentary program
 "The Telescope" (BoJack Horseman), a 2014 television episode
 The Telescope (magazine), an American monthly for amateur astronomers 1931–1941
 The Telescope (Magritte), a 1963 painting by René Magritte
 Telescope, a type of dolly zoom film/video shot
 The Telescope, a 1957 play by R. C. Sherriff

Other uses
 Telescope (horse) (foaled 2010), an Irish Thoroughbred racehorse
 Telescopium, "The Telescope", a constellation

See also 
 Telescopic cylinder
 Telescoping (mechanics)
 Telescoping (rail cars), collision event where a car is displaced into interior of another
 Telescoping effect, in which past events are recalled as having occurred more recently
 Telescoping series, in mathematics
 Telescoping generations, in biology